Joyce Burditt (September 12, 1938 – June 2, 2022), also known as Joyce Rebeta-Burditt, was an American writer and network executive. She was known for creating the TV series Diagnosis: Murder. She was also a longtime writer and producer on such TV series as Perry Mason, Matlock, and the Father Dowling Mysteries. She wrote a best selling novel, The Cracker Factory, in 1977, about an alcoholic housewife, partly drawn from her own experiences.

Early life and education 
Joyce Ellen Rebeta was born in Cleveland, Ohio, the daughter of Paul John Rebeta and Coletta Ellen Rebeta (later Supp). Both of her parents were also born in Cleveland. After moving to Southern California in 1969, she took classes at Los Angeles Valley Junior College.

Career 
Burditt was known for creating the TV series Diagnosis: Murder, which ran for almost 200 episodes and TV movies. She was also a longtime writer and producer on such TV series as Perry Mason, Matlock, and the Father Dowling Mysteries. Burditt was a programming executive for comedy at ABC, serving as a liaison between the network and sitcom productions including Barney Miller and Soap. Her last television writing credit was on seven episodes of Mystery Woman (2005–2006), a series of films for the Hallmark Channel, starring Kellie Martin.

She wrote a best selling novel, The Cracker Factory, in 1977, about an alcoholic housewife, which is partly drawn from her own experiences with alcoholism and institutionalization. It was made into an American TV movie of the same name. This was followed by the sequel, The Cracker Factory 2: Welcome to Women's Group, in 2010. She wrote the humorous novel Triplets, in 1981, and the mystery novel Buck Naked, about a Los Angeles detective heroine, in 1996.

Publications 

 The Cracker Factory (1977)
 Triplets (1981)
 Buck Naked (1996)
 The Cracker Factory 2: Welcome to the Women's Group (2010)

Personal life 
Rebeta married the writer George Burditt in 1957 and had three children. They later divorced. Her son Jack Burditt became a screenwriter. On June 2, 2022, she died in Los Angeles. Her grave is in the San Fernando Mission Cemetery in Mission Hills.

References

External links 

1938 births
2022 deaths
American women screenwriters
American women television producers
American women novelists
20th-century American novelists
21st-century American novelists
American television executives
Women television executives
Screenwriters from California
21st-century American women writers
20th-century American women writers
20th-century American screenwriters
21st-century American screenwriters
Writers from Cleveland
Novelists from Ohio
Screenwriters from Ohio
Novelists from California
Television producers from Ohio
Television producers from California